Luis Sandoval may refer to:
 Luis Sandoval (broadcaster), Mexican actor, reporter and entertainer
 Luis Sandoval (footballer) (born 1999), Colombian footballer 
 Luis Sandoval (wrestler), Panamanian wrestler
 Luis Alonso Sandoval (born 1981), Mexican footballer
 Luis Cresencio Sandoval, Mexican defense secretary